Marie Logoreci (born Çurçija; 23 September 1920 – 19 June 1988) was an Albanian film and stage actress. She started her career as a singer in Radio Tirana (1945), before making her breakthrough appearance as an actress in the film The Great Warrior Skanderbeg (1953).
With all the successful performances made in film, she remained a great actress of the Albanian cinema and icon of the Albanian National Theater.
For her contributions she has received honorary titles People's Artist of Albania (1975) and Honor of Nation Order (2015).

Early life
Logoreci was born in Shkodër, Albania. Her father, Palok Çurçija, was a craftsman and her mother, Roza, was a housewife. Logoreci was very early introduced to home financial difficulties and to social dramas of the time also reflected in her family as well. She was enrolled at Stigmatine Sisters School of Shkodër, a girls school.

Later on, Logoreci joined the gymnasium. She was gifted at drawing and singing. During her singing she started to accompany herself a mandolin and a guitar. She did not like math and religious classes. From her childhood only 20 drawings have survived; they are witness of a mild and delicate spirit by showing a fine capture of the object, an observant eye, and a harmony in colors and precision. She also learned Italian and Montenegrin as a child.

What mostly traced her soul were the popular narrations, legends and epic songs of the Northern Albania that she heard around her family. Her knowledge of the Albanian folklore and ethnography was soon to be her new passion. When she was 17 she moved permanently to Tirana.

She married Kolë Logoreci, an economist who had just come back from his studies in Vienna. As a hobby Kolë also was a member of Society of Friends of Music in Vienna, for almost five years getting lessons on violin. Kolë had an excellent career as the Chief of State Budget Department. He was also a recipient of the high title Order of Skanderbeg.

Kolë was the son of Mati Logoreci himself a very distinguished teacher and linguist, a man of social reputation at his time. He was a descendant of Logoreci family, whose name dates from the years 1300 with the name Logoreseos.

Artistic life

Singer at Radio Tirana
Logoreci's artistic life began as a singer for Radio Tirana in 1945 where she sang solo. She sang folk songs of Shkodër and Middle Albania in live radio broadcast. Meanwhile, she attended a one-year study of canto at Tirana artistic lyceum under the guidance of soprano Jorgjia Filçe-Truja (People's Artist of Albania). Logoreci also made her appearance in various concerts in Albania and Bulgaria. She has sung around 100 different songs in Radio Tirana during the 1945–1947 years.

Stage acting
In 1947 she was a leading singer with the National Chorus giving tour concerts in Albania and abroad. That same year she was offered to play dramas as a lead actress in the National Theater of Albania.

As a stage actress she's filled a vast gallery of unforgettable characters as in the way she acted them out masterfully, the way she expressed and manifested them. The range of her leading roles is wide enough to comprise characters of quite opponent with one another in mould and psychology. Her professional performing reached emotional borders swinging from bright sides of human psyche to the darkest features of it. She will be unforgettable in the following works:

 As Alisa Lengton, the whimsical conservative and racist bourgeois lady in the play Deep Roots.
 As Gertrude, the suicidal queen in Hamlet.
 As Fatime, the woman experienced in court intrigues, servile and arrogant, in Halili and Hajria.
 As Bernarda Alba, the dark cold lady of The House of Bernarda Alba drama from Federico García Lorca.

Logoreci has performed in 40 stage dramas. All her performances of Shakespeare's, of Molière's, of Lorca's, or Gorky's dramas, as well as them of the Albanian authors—Kole Jakova, Ndreke Luca etc.—demonstrated her particular artistic abilities, and all outlined her portrait as an artist of individuality, and reflects harmony between her acting and her external plastics. She had managed to have a clear knowledge of the acoustics; she'd achieved such a virtuosity in her actions bridging the distance between her and the audience. Her dynamics and her temperament had marked her voice with a high key of intonation which was suggestive in her stage performances.

Logoreci's long career as an actress brought her the interest to try directing. As a stage director she has also made an important contribution.

Film acting
Logoreci was one of the pioneers of the Albanian movies. She had a role in the very first Albanian movie, a short feature of about 12 minutes long, produced by the Albanian Film Studio and Albanian Television. Logoreci's roles in films manifest their particularity and have their value in the history of the Albanian cinematography. The first important film she acted in was The Great Warrior Skanderbeg. The most unforgettable role played by her in a movie is that of "Loke" in "Toka Jone" (Our Land).

Her art
Logoreci shaped her art by observing life carefully. She accumulated enough experience so she could input it later in her performances. In front of the spectators she created in stage the human soul, pain, protest, revolt, hate, cynicism, hypocrisy, and cunning; she offered them the magic of the play, what the real art can invoke. Her artistic lingo was expressive; her stage gestures demanded and were applied with masterly affection, and Logoreci gave life to all those performances signing up her individuality and personal stature in art.

Logoreci survived in art lovers' memories as a candid, simple and sincere human being, a woman of a great knowledge and art mastery. At the same time she is remembered by many young artists as someone extremely pleasant to talk to with or to get advice from.

Filmography
The Great Warrior Skanderbeg (1953)
Fëmijet e saj (1957) 
Tana (1958)
Detyrë e posaçme (1963)
Toka jonë (1964)
Oshëtimë në bregdet (1966)
Njësiti guerril (1969)
Operacioni Zjarri (1973)
Gjenerali i Ushtrisë së Vdekur, TV (1976)
Nga mesi i errësirës (1978)
Dollia e dasmës sime (1978)
Çeta e vogël (1979)

Drama
Most known:
 The Russian Affair 	(1947) - Jessie
 Tartuffe			(1947) - Elmire
 Deep Roots		(1949) - Alisa Lengton
 The Plot of the Condemned	(1950) - Christina Padera
 Halili and Hajria		(1950) - Fatima
 Six Lovers		(1952) - Alyona Patrovna
 Revizor		        (1952) - Lady Lukiç
 Toka Jonë			(1954) - Loke
 Intrigue and Love		(1957) - Lady Milford
 Seven Knights		(1958) - Triga
 Hamlet			(1960) - Gertrude
 The House of Bernarda Alba (1961) - Bernarda Alba
 The Moral of Madame Dulska (1962) - Tadrahova
 The Great Wall		(1966) - Mother Jun
 The Perkolgjinajs		(1966) - Mara
 Drita			(1967) - Manushaqja - directed by Marie Logoreci
 The Lass of the Mountains	(1967) - Prenda
 Everybody's Roof		(1968) - The old woman
 The Big Drown		(1977) - Gjela

Awards and honorary titles
 Merited Artist (Artiste e Merituar), 1961
 Naim Frashëri Order (Urdhri "Naim Frashëri"), 1969
 People's Artist (Artiste e Popullit), 1975
 Honor of Nation Order (Nderi i Kombit), 2015

See also
List of famous Albanians

References

External links

1920 births
1988 deaths
People from Shkodër
Albanian film actresses
Albanian stage actresses
20th-century Albanian women singers
People's Artists of Albania
20th-century Albanian actresses